Tower of Power is the third album release for the Oakland-based band, Tower of Power.  This is their most successful album to date, which was released in May 1973.

The album peaked at No. 15 on the Billboard Top LPs chart in 1973 and received a gold record award for sales in excess of 500,000.  The album spawned their most successful single, "So Very Hard to Go".  The single peaked at No. 17 during the week of July 28, 1973 on the Billboard Hot 100.  Two other singles from the album also charted on the Billboard Hot 100: "This Time It's Real" and "What Is Hip?". It marked the debut of Lenny Williams being the lead vocalist (though Williams had a solo career prior to joining T.O.P., plus he co-penned the song "You Strike My Main Nerve" from the previous album Bump City). Tower of Power was also the first Tower of Power album to feature future Saturday Night Live band leader Lenny Pickett, who was the youngest member of the band at the time, replacing original lead sax player Skip Mesquite.  Also joining the lineup were organist/keyboardist Chester Thompson and guitarist Bruce Conte, who replaced original guitarist Willie James Fulton.

Track listing 
All songs written by Emilio Castillo and Stephen "Doc" Kupka except when noted.
 "What Is Hip?"  (Castillo, Kupka, David Garibaldi) -	5:08
 "Clever Girl"  (Castillo, Kupka, Willie Fulton) -	2:56
 "This Time It's Real" (David Bartlett, Castillo, Kupka) -	2:54
 "Will I Ever Find a Love?" – 	3:51
 "Get Yo' Feet Back on the Ground"  (Fulton) - 4:52
 "So Very Hard to Go" – 	3:41
 "Soul Vaccination" – 	5:13
 "Both Sorry Over Nothin'" (Castillo, Kupka, Lenny Williams) -	3:25
 "Clean Slate"  (Castillo, Kupka, Fulton) -	3:22
 "Just Another Day" (Bruce Conte) - 	4:34

Personnel 
Tower of Power
 Lenny Williams – lead vocals
 Chester Thompson – organ, backing vocals
 Bruce Conte – guitars, backing vocals	
 Francis Rocco Prestia – bass
 David Garibaldi – drums	
 Brent Byars – bongos, congas
 Stephen "Doc" Kupka – baritone saxophone, oboe, backing vocals
 Lenny Pickett – clarinet, flute, first tenor saxophone, backing vocals	
 Emilio Castillo – second tenor saxophone, backing vocals
 Mic Gillette – trombone, trumpet, flugelhorn, baritone horn, backing vocals	
 Greg Adams – trumpet, flugelhorn, string arrangements and conductor, backing vocals

Additional musicians
 Jay Spell – acoustic piano	
 Bruce Steinberg – harmonica

Production 
 Tower of Power – producers
 Emilio Castillo – supervising producer 
 Jim Gaines – recording, mixing 
 Alan Chinowsky – mix assistant 
 Bruce Steinberg – design, illustration, photography

References

External links
 Tower Of Power-Tower Of Power at Discogs

1973 albums
Tower of Power albums
Warner Records albums